Cologne is a town and commune in the province of Brescia, in Lombardy.  Cologne is located in Franciacorta at the foot of Monte Orfano. Neighbouring communes are Coccaglio, Erbusco, Palazzolo sull'Oglio and Chiari.

References

Cities and towns in Lombardy